Karl Robert Max Bülowius (2 March 1890 – 27 March 1945) was a German Army officer who served during the First World War and the Second World War. He also served eleven non-consecutive years for the Weimar Republic during the interwar period which began in 1919 and ended in September 1939.

Life and career

Early life and World War I
Karl Bülowius was born on 2 March 1890 in Königsberg, Germany (now Kaliningrad, Russia). He joined the Prussian Army on 26 November 1907 and became an officer cadet of the engineering troops (Fahnenjunker) where he would make his promotion to Leutnant (second lieutenant) on 19 June 1909. Bülowius participated in the First World War, serving in various engineering departments of the German Army that were involved in military duties in both Europe and Palestine. During the year 1918 (which would become the final year of the war), Bülowius was elevated to the rank of Hauptmann (captain). The First World War would end six months later on 11 November with a defeat for Germany and her allies - limiting Germany's army to 100000 men until Adolf Hitler broke the Treaty of Versailles fifteen years later. He was relieved from the Army on December 31, 1920 due to unfortunate circumstances surrounding the structure of Germany's post-World War I military.

However, Bülowius returned to active military service on 1 June 1924. He would serve in various engineering and cavalry units of the Reichswehr during the 1920s and the 1930s.

World War II and suicide
At the beginning of World War II, he commanded Oberbaustab X. Bülowius became commanding officer (Pionierführer) of engineering parts of the 8th Army on 26 October 1939. Success in commanding the 8th Army would result in Bülowius holding on the same post when he was transferred to the 9th Army on 15 May 1940. Transferred to North Africa, Bülowius commanded the engineers of Panzer Army Africa on 25 October 1942. Between 17 and 25 February 1943, he commanded the entire group. Bülowius held the position of post commander in von Manteuffel's former division in April 1943 and kept it until he was captured the following month. Von Manteuffel had been evacuated back to Germany due to exhaustion and later sent to the Eastern Front on a promotion to Major General.

He was captured by U.S. troops on 9 May 1943 near the end of the North African campaign. The North Africa campaign would end seven days later on 16 May 1943 when the Axis (mostly containing troops from Nazi Germany and Fascist Italy) forces were forced to retreat to Southern Italy in a decisive defeat. Bülowius finished his career in the German Heer component by committing suicide on March 27, 1945 at the prisoner-of-war camp named Camp Forrest in Coffee County, Tennessee, USA. He is interred at the Chattanooga National Cemetery in Chattanooga, Tennessee, USA.

Credentials

Promotions
 Fahnenjunker – 26 November 1907 
  Fähnrich – 18 August 1908 
 Leutnant – 19 June 1909
 Oberleutnant – 18 June 1915
 Hauptmann (Captain) – May 1918
 Major – 1 April 1934 
 Oberstleutnant – 1 August 1936 
 Oberst – 5 January 1939
 Generalmajor – 1 April 1942
 Generalleutnant – 1 April 1943

Awards
  Iron Cross (1914), II. and I. Class
 Türkische Silberne Liakat-(Verdienst)-Medaille mit Schwertern 
 Türkischer Eiserner Halbmond 
 Königlich Bulgarische Tapferkeitsorden, IV. Klasse (II. Stufe) 
 Ehrenkreuz für Frontkämpfer
 Wehrmacht-Dienstauszeichnung, IV. to I. Class
 Iron Cross (1939), 2. and 1. Class
 Kriegsverdienstkreuz (1939) II. und I. Klasse mit Schwertern  
 Medaille "Winterschlacht im Osten 1941/42" 
 Ärmelband "Afrika" 
  German Cross in Silver – November 30, 1942 as Generalmajor and Armee-Pionier-Führer der 9. Armee

In fiction
Bülowius would make a "special guest appearance" in the Japanese video game Sgt. Saunders' Combat!. This officer is only seen during the North Africa campaign of 1942–43; particularly during the Tunisia Campaign. He holds the rank of Generalmajor in the game and can be killed by any Allied Forces unit. In campaign mode, Bülowius can only be utilized by the AI opponent. He may be seen in other video games related to World War II that involve either the Eastern Front and/or the North Africa campaign.

Citations

Book

Web

External links
 Rommel's desert commanders (Google Books)
 PRISONERS OF WAR—COLD WAR ALLIES: THE ANGLO-AMERICAN RELATIONSHIP WITH WEHRMACHT GENERALS at Texas A&M University

1890 births
1945 suicides
Military personnel from Königsberg
German people who died in prison custody
German prisoners of war in World War II held by the United States
People who committed suicide in prison custody
Recipients of the Iron Cross (1914), 1st class
Lieutenant generals of the German Army (Wehrmacht)
German military personnel who committed suicide
Prussian Army personnel
Reichswehr personnel
Recipients of the Silver Liakat Medal
Recipients of the Order of Bravery, 4th class
Suicides in Tennessee
Prisoners who died in United States military detention